The Soviet Project 183R class, more commonly known as the Komar class, its NATO reporting name, meaning "mosquito", is a class of missile boats, the first of its kind, built in the 1950s and 1960s. Notably, they were the first to sink another ship with anti-ship missiles in 1967.

Design 

The Project 183 motor torpedo boat (MTB) was designed just after World War II. These boats were armed with two  torpedo tubes and were used extensively by Soviet coastal forces in the 1950s. The torpedo boat had a wooden semi-planing hull and was fitted with radar. Over 622 MTBs were built. A submarine chaser variant fitted with sonar and depth charges was also built as was a radio-controlled target boat.

In 1956, the P-15 Termit missile became available (NATO reporting name: SS-N-2 "Styx"). The Project 183 proved to be a natural choice for mounting the new missiles, giving the small, fast boats great firepower for their size. The new combination was designated Project 183R (R apparently for raketny - rocket), the first missile boat in service anywhere in the world. The missiles could be fired in sea state 4.

A total of 112 Komars were built between 1956 and 1965 and served in the Soviet Navy, along with several allied navies, until the 1980s, when they were replaced by newer, more capable fast attack craft.

Export ships 

  - 6 boats 1967
  - 8 boats (1961) plus about 40 built under licence. The Chinese also built a steel-hulled derivative as the Type 024 class missile boat
  - 18 boats
  - 7 boats (1962–67), retired in the early 1990s; The Egyptian Navy built 6 derivative boats equipped with western weapons and electronics in the early 1980s as the 
  - 12 boats (1961–65)
  - 3 boats (1972)
  - 6 boats donated between 1969 and 1974, all retired between 1998 and 2002. 
  - 10 boats
  - 9 boats
  - 4 boats

Combat use 
 1967 October 21 - Egyptian Navy Komar-class missile boats sank Israeli destroyer  in the first combat use of P-15 Termit anti-ship missiles. This was the first time a ship had sunk another ship using guided missiles.
 7 October 1973 - Two Syrian Navy Komar-class missile boats along with an Osa I-class missile boat, a K-123 torpedo boat and a T43-class minesweeper fought unsuccessfully against four Israeli Navy s and one  in the Battle of Latakia.  Other Syrian missile boats fired missiles from within the harbor that mistakenly or due to malfunction hit civilian craft in the harbour.

See also
 List of ships of the Soviet Navy
 List of ships of Russia by project number

Notes

References

Bibliography
 
 Also published as

External links
 Complete Ship List of all Komar class missile boats

Missile boat classes
Missile boats of the Soviet Navy
 
Missile boats of the Algerian National Navy
Missile boats of the Cuban Navy
 
Missile boats of the Egyptian Navy
Missile boats of the Indonesian Navy
Missile boats of the Iraqi Navy
Missile boats of the Korean People's Navy
 
Missile boats of the People's Liberation Army Navy
Missile boats of the Syrian Navy
Missile boats of the Vietnam People's Navy